Mjimandra is a village on the island of Anjouan in the Comoros. According to the 1991 census the village had a population of 1,937.

References

Populated places in Anjouan